Konar-e Ziarat (also Romanized as Konār-e Zīārat) is a village in Fedagh Rural District, Central District, Gerash County, Fars Province, Iran. At the 2016 census, its population was 224, in 62 families.

References 

Populated places in Gerash County